The Lincoln Building built in 1908 was a historic school building located off U.S. 281 in Carrington, North Dakota.  It was designed by Fargo architects Haxby & Gillespie and was built in 1908.

On April 30, 1980, it was added to the National Register of Historic Places. Reportedly, it was scheduled to be torn down in June or July 2008.  It was removed from the National Register in February 2011.

See also
 Carrington Public School

References

External links
 Image of Lincoln Building

School buildings on the National Register of Historic Places in North Dakota
2008 disestablishments in North Dakota
Former National Register of Historic Places in North Dakota
National Register of Historic Places in Foster County, North Dakota
Demolished buildings and structures in North Dakota
1908 establishments in North Dakota
School buildings completed in 1908
Education in Foster County, North Dakota